Naval Station Argentia  is a former base of the United States Navy that operated from 1941 to 1994. It was established in the community of Argentia in what was then the Dominion of Newfoundland, which later became the tenth Canadian province, Newfoundland and Labrador.

Construction

Established under the British-US destroyers for bases agreement of 1940, the base was first occupied on 25 January 1941 following the expropriation of the flat headland formed by a small natural bay called Little Placentia Sound and the western end facing Placentia Bay by the Newfoundland government; over 400 families were displaced.

Civilian construction crews from civilian contractors George A. Fuller Company and Merritt-Chapman and Scott Corporation, rushed to build the base as well as an adjoining air field. On 15 July 1941, the Naval Operating Base was commissioned. On 12 October 1942 the 17th Naval Construction Battalion began to arrive at the base and worked jointly with the civilians until 5 May 1943. At that time it became a completely military operation. Before that happened the 64th CB started to arrive in March followed by the 69th CB in June. On 17 November 1943, Construction Battalion Maintenance Units (CBMUs) 525 and 526 arrived to take over the station maintenance with the CB's having completed the base's construction.

Atlantic Conference

On 7 August 1941 the heavy cruiser USS Augusta carrying U.S. President Franklin D. Roosevelt arrived in the anchorage at Little Placentia Bay off the base. Roosevelt inspected the base construction progress and did some fishing from Augusta over the next two days. Augusta was joined by the British warship HMS Prince of Wales carrying British Prime Minister Winston Churchill on 9 August 1941. While in the Argentia anchorage from 9–12 August, the chiefs of staff of Britain and the U.S. met to discuss war strategies and logistics once the U.S. joined in the war. The two leaders and their aides also negotiated the wording of a press release that they called a "joint statement". That press release was issued on 14 August 1941 in Washington, D.C. and was issued simultaneously in London, England. Several days later the Daily Herald would characterize the public statement as being the Atlantic Charter. However, there never was a signed, legal document called the "Atlantic Charter". Neither Roosevelt nor Churchill signed it. The conference concluded the evening of 12 August 1941 with the British and American warships and their escorts passing in review before departing the area for their home ports. The joint declaration was publicly announced on 14 August, presumably after Prince of Wales had returned to UK waters.

Second World War operations

On 28 August 1941 Naval Air Station Argentia was commissioned. NAS Argentia was built on the plateau atop the triangular peninsula adjacent to Naval Station Argentia's anchorage and shore facilities. The air station was used to base convoy protection, coastal patrol and anti-submarine aircraft, both land-based aircraft and seaplanes. While NAS Argentia was nominally an independent facility from Naval Station Argentia, both facilities are largely viewed as one.

Beginning that summer,  was used to house Flag Headquarters at the base.

Over 100 victims were buried in Argentia's military cemetery.

United States Army Coast Artillery Corps troops were first deployed to Argentia in early 1941, at first a single coast defence battery with two or four 155 mm guns and an anti-aircraft battery. In January 1942 construction began on two batteries of 6-inch guns, and in March 1942 the United States Army established Fort McAndrew at Argentia to provide security to the navy base through an anti-aircraft battery and additional coast defence guns. Later that spring the Royal Navy established a small maintenance base at Argentia to service its ships involved in convoy escort groups operating out of Halifax, Sydney, St. John's and in the Gulf of Saint Lawrence.

A US Navy-manned indicator loop station (Station 1X) was at Argentia; this detected submarines via their magnetic signature.

In the spring of 1943 a 7,000 ton floating drydock was installed at Argentia, along with a ship repair facility. In August 1943, Task Force 24 Flag Headquarters moved ashore to permanent facilities after having been housed aboard USS Prairie.

In 1944, Argentia served as one of the two stopover bases for the refuelling, maintenance, and crew changes of the six United States Navy (USN) K-class blimps that made the first transatlantic crossings of non-rigid airships. Blimps K-123 and K-130 from USN Blimp Squadron 14 (also known as ZP-14, Blimpron 14, or "The Africa Squadron") left South Weymouth Naval Air Station in Massachusetts on 28 May 1944 and landed at Argentia about 16 hours later. The two K-ships then flew for approximately 22 hours to Lages Field on Terceira Island in the Azores, the second stopover base for the transatlantic flights. The last leg was a ~20-hour flight to the squadron's final destination with Fleet Air Wing (FAW) 15 at Port Lyautey, French Morocco (now Kenitra, Morocco). Blimps K-123 and K-130 were followed by K-109 and K-134 then K-112 and K-101 which left South Weymouth on 11 and 27 June, respectively, in 1944. These six blimps initially conducted nighttime anti-submarine warfare operations to complement the daytime missions flown by FAW-15 aircraft (PBYs and PB4Y-2) using magnetic anomaly detection to locate U-boats in the relatively shallow waters around the Strait of Gibraltar. Later, ZP-14 K-ships conducted minespotting and minesweeping operations in key Mediterranean ports and various escort missions including that of the convoy carrying Franklin Roosevelt and Winston Churchill to the Yalta Conference in early 1945. In late April 1945, K-89 and K-114 left NAS Weeksville (now Coast Guard Air Station Elizabeth City) in North Carolina and flew a southern route to NAS Bermuda, the Azores, and Port Lyautey, where they arrived on 1 May 1945.

Aerodrome

The field was listed as "all hard surfaced" and had three runways listed as follows:

Fort McAndrew

United States Army Coast Artillery Corps troops were first deployed to Argentia in January 1941, initially Battery A of the 57th Coast Artillery (Tractor Drawn) (TD) Regiment with two or possibly four mobile 155 mm guns, and Battery B of the 62nd Coast Artillery (Anti-aircraft) (AA) Regiment. A command known as the Harbor Defenses of Argentia and St. John's was established at this time to coordinate US coast defence activities in Newfoundland, under the Newfoundland Base Command. On 20 July 1941 the 155 mm gun battery was redesignated as Battery A, 53rd Coast Artillery (TD) Regiment, and on 1 August 1941 (some sources 1942) the AA battery was redesignated as Battery A, 421st CA (AA) Battalion (Separate). After the US entered the war following the attack on Pearl Harbor on 7 December 1941, construction on two batteries (Batteries 281 and 282) of two 6-inch guns each began in January 1942 and was completed in October 1942. These guns were on shielded long-range carriages with reinforced concrete and earth bunkers housing magazines and fire control equipment. On 16 February 1942 the harbour defence units in Newfoundland were redesignated as components of the 24th Coast Artillery (Harbor Defense) (Composite) Regiment, the headquarters and two additional batteries of which arrived at Fort McAndrew from the US on 25 March 1942. In April 1942 the AA defences were strengthened with the arrival of the 422nd CA Battalion (AA).

By the end of 1942 the coast defence gun batteries in the Argentia area were as follows:

In March 1943 the 24th CA Regiment was reduced to a battalion. In December 1943-January 1944 elements of the unit returned to the US for inactivation. In October 1944 the unit was reorganized, but was not fully inactivated until 8 September 1945. The date the unit was transferred to the US for inactivation is unclear. Postwar, circa 1946 the coast defence batteries were inactivated. The 6-inch guns of Batteries 281 and 282 survive. Battery 282's guns are still in place, and in 1993 Battery 281's guns were moved to Fort Columbia in Washington state, US.

Cold War operations
Following the war's end in August 1945, the first dependents of naval personnel were permitted to move to Argentia to live in permanent quarters on base.

In 1946, Fort McAndrew was transferred to the U.S. Army Air Forces which became the United States Air Force in 1947. In 1948, Fort McAndrew was renamed McAndrew Air Force Base.

In 1949, Newfoundland joined the Canadian Confederation as the 10th province. During the Cold War, Argentia Naval Station became a key "node" in the Northwest Atlantic's SOSUS network, helping to detect Soviet nuclear submarines. During that period an atypical SOSUS system was installed in 1959 to provide surveillance for approaches to Hudson Bay. It was a shallow water, curved array with ten eight-element arrays installed on two cables with each cable having the capacity for the usual forty elements. The base was the target of several espionage attempts between the 1940s–1990s as a result.

In 1955 McAndrew AFB was decommissioned and the facility was turned over to the US Navy with USAF personnel moving to other locations in Newfoundland such as Ernest Harmon AFB, Goose AFB or various radar installations being built in conjunction with the Royal Canadian Air Force such as the Pinetree Line, Mid-Canada Line and Distant Early Warning Line. Associated with the DEW Line, radar picket ships such as USS Hissem used the base, and Lockheed WV-2 Warning Star aircraft used the airfield. These ships and aircraft were called Barrier Force Atlantic (BARLANT) and operated from 1955 through 1965.

In 1959 the Navy deployed a portable Transit tracking station at the station, which recorded the doppler data from the 24-minute flight of the Transit 1A satellite launched on 17 September 1959. An ionospheric refraction value was calculated using the doppler data recovered by the portable station, and a correction factor was then applied to the data to produce a doppler curve unaffected by ionospheric refraction. The Satellite 1-A trajectory thus determined was in close agreement with range track data. 

In 1959 the United States Naval Facility (NAVFAC) Argentia was established as a Sound Surveillance System (SOSUS) shore terminal. The next year NAVFAC Argentia was terminus for an atypical SOSUS shallow water system designated King Shallow Water composed of ten eight-element arrays, vice the usual forty element deep water arrays. The shallow water system was intended to monitor Soviet patrols into Hudson Bay. In 1963 the first 2x20 array was installed terminating at NAVFAC Argentia. The shallow water system was deactivated in 1968.

Closure
In 1972 NAVFAC became a joint operations station for the US Navy and the Canadian Forces but Naval Air Station Argentia was decommissioned and the land transferred in 1975 to the Government of Canada. It was subsequently transferred to the provincial government for development. On 30 September 1994 the US Navy left Argentia completely when NAVFAC Argentia was decommissioned (Canadian operations were transferred to Canadian Forces IUSS Centre in Halifax) and the last personnel moved out.

Until 1994, the runways of the former airfield were utilized by the Royal Canadian Air Cadets. The Air Cadets operated weekend glider familiarization through the Air Cadet Gliding Program. The Schweizer SGS 2-33 was launched using an auto-tow launch method, utilizing the entire length of the runway surfaces. Personnel were housed at the Naval Station Argentia facilities. After the US Naval Station was decommissioned, the glider program was operated without facilities support for a few years until the airfield was occupied for the Hydromet Test Facility owned by INCO. With the announcement that the INCO development would not be using the airfield, the Air Cadet Gliding Program once again started using the airfield for gliding operations in May 2008.

See also
US Naval Advance Bases

References

Bibliography 
 Gaines, William C., Coast Artillery Organizational History, 1917-1950, Coast Defense Journal, vol. 23, issue 2
 Hein, David. "Vulnerable: HMS Prince of Wales in 1941." Journal of Military History 77, no. 3 (July 2013): 955–989.

External links 
 
 NAVFAC Argentia, Newfoundland established
 Photos: NAVFAC NF Argentia, 1960–1999

Argentia
Military installations closed in 1994
Military airbases in Newfoundland and Labrador
Argentia
Argentia
Argentia
Argentia
Destroyers for Bases Agreement airfields
Argentia
1941 establishments in Newfoundland
1994 disestablishments in Newfoundland and Labrador
Closed installations of the United States Navy
Military installations established in 1941